"We're Almost There" is a 1975 song released as a single by singer Michael Jackson, the first release from his final Motown album, Forever, Michael.

Background
As Jackson's voice changed a bit, Motown found it difficult to find material to suit the 16-year-old Jackson, who had sung in a higher voice for most of the duration of his Motown tenure. With the return of the Holland brothers Brian and Edward, Motown had the duo write a collection of songs to fit Jackson's age.

Reception
Cash Box said that "sweet strings soar high above a polished production as Michael Jackson's sugary vocal slides sexily along." Record World said that "it's the youthful
Jackson's first single in almost two years, but well worth the wait."

Charts
The duo composed this song and the modest hit, "Just a Little Bit of You", which became a top forty hit after this single was released. Performing more modestly, the song eventually peaked at number 54 on the pop chart while hitting number 7 on the R&B chart. These two singles would end up being the last Jackson released as an active Motown artist though the label continued to release Jackson singles until 1984.

Credits
Lead vocal by Michael Jackson
Produced by Brian Holland

Samples
The song was later sampled on the 2010 hip-hop release "Our Dreams" on the Wu-Massacre album and on the 2009 hip-hop release "Almost There" on the Poindexter mixtape by Donald Glover.

References

1975 singles
1981 singles
Michael Jackson songs
Songs written by Eddie Holland
Songs written by Brian Holland
Motown singles
Song recordings produced by Brian Holland
Song recordings produced by Edward Holland Jr.
1975 songs